Mario Cartaro (c. 1540–1620) was an engraver, draftsman, and print merchant.

Cartaro was sometimes believed to be of northern European origin, since he used the signature "Kartarius" as well as "Cartarius". However, his 1579 Map of Rome is signed "Marius Kartarius Viterbensis," indicating that he came from Viterbo. Active in Rome since 1560, he became famous as an engraver of works by various artists, views of the city, and - principally - maps. In addition to the Map of Rome, one of his more noteworthy accomplishments is the rare Description of the territory of Perugia drawn by Egnazio Danti (1536-1586). In 1586, Cartaro moved to Naples, where he was commissioned to prepare maps and charts of localities of the Kingdom of Naples.

References 
 Museo Galileo. "Mario Cartaro". Catalogue of the Museo Galileo's Instruments on Display. catalogue.museogalileo.it

16th-century births
17th-century deaths
Italian engravers